The I Gran Premio de Mexico (or 1st Mexican Grand Prix) was held on 4 November 1962 at the Magdalena Mixhuca circuit, Mexico City. The race was a non-championship event run to Formula One rules and attracted a large entry, including many top teams and drivers. The race was run over 60 laps of the main circuit, and was eventually won by Jim Clark and Trevor Taylor, sharing a drive in a Lotus 25. The race meeting was marred by the death during practice of local driving prodigy Ricardo Rodríguez. The circuit would later be renamed the Autódromo Hermanos Rodríguez to honour him and his brother Pedro.

Race summary
Pole-sitter Clark suffered a flat battery, so his Lotus 25-Climax got a replacement, but still failed to start; mechanics gave it a push start to get the engine going. However, due to a lack of communication between the starting officials, the start flag was waved while marshals were still on the track. For John Surtees, the delay caused a cylinder to burn out and his race was over before it even started. The race stewards decided the push start had been illegal (despite it being done by race officials) and black-flagged Clark's car (leaking oil in addition, to unlikely to survive full distance in any case) on lap 10.

Clark took over the second works Lotus of Lotus team-mate, Trevor Taylor, during a pit stop, dropping him to third, behind Jack Brabham's Brabham and Bruce McLaren in the Cooper.  The Scot put in a superb drive to claw back the 57 second deficit on the leaders, passing both with over one third of the race distance still remaining. McLaren's engine blew after half-distance, and as the Brabham was also having trouble, Clark completed the remainder of the race with very little opposition, scoring an easy win. This would prove to be the final time that a Grand Prix victory would be shared by two drivers.

Also notable was the participation of German driver Wolfgang Seidel, who competed despite having had his FIA licence suspended over two months previously. The Porsche works team did not attend, Porsche having withdrawn from motor sport at the end of the 1962 World Championship season.

Despite the starting confusion, the race earned the Mexican Grand Prix full World Championship status from 1963, which it would retain until 1970.

Results

 Moisés Solana withdrew from the event during practice, complaining that his car was too slow. His fastest recorded time was faster than those of Seidel, Connell, Rader, Chamberlain and Hansgen.

References
 
  Note that the track length and race distance seem to be incorrectly quoted, while times/speed imply correct numbers (5.000 km/300.000 km) which agree with MotorSport source.
 

Mexican Grand Prix
Mexican Grand Prix
Grand
November 1962 sports events in Mexico